Route 978 is a regional north-south Israeli highway in the Golan Heights.

Junctions and interchanges on the route
Route 978 begins in the north near Mas'ade at Odem Forest Junction with Highway 98.  
The next junction is to an access road turning east into Odem.  
Farther south, at Gov Ga'ash Junction, Route 978 intersects with Route 9799 turning east toward Al Rom.  
At Ha'amir junction, Route 978 crosses Route 959.
About 2 km south of Ha'amir junction, an access road turns left into Sha'al.
Route 978 ends in the south at HaShiryon Junction with Highway 91.

See also
List of highways in Israel

Roads in Israeli-occupied territories